Ryan McIlvain is an American novelist and essayist. He is the author of Elders (2013) and The Radicals (2018). A former recipient of the Wallace Stegner Fellowship in Fiction at Stanford University, McIlvain is currently an Assistant Professor of English and Writing at the University of Tampa.

Awards
2013: Center for Fiction First Novel Prize for Elders (finalist)
2018: AML Award for Tower (Sunstone) (finalist)

References 

21st-century American novelists
Living people
Place of birth missing (living people)
American male novelists
American male essayists
Stegner Fellows
Stanford University alumni
University of Tampa faculty
1982 births
21st-century American male writers